The Brenton Reef Light was a Texas tower lighthouse at the entrance to Narragansett Bay, Rhode Island, United States, south of Beavertail Point. Erected to replace a lightship in 1962, it was decommissioned in 1989 due to its deteriorating condition.

History

This offshore station was marked by a succession of lightships beginning in 1853, with new vessels being assigned to the station in 1856, 1897, and 1935. In the early 1960s the United States Coast Guard initiated a program to replace these lightships with large steel towers, commonly known as Texas towers. Brenton Reef was selected for such replacement, but a somewhat smaller facility was constructed instead.  This light was originally a manned station, with living quarters and galley, as well as engine room to supply power to the light and living quarters.  It was connected to the Beavertail Light by submarine cables and maintained by Coast Guardsmen out of the Newport, Rhode Island station, and was converted to fully automatic operation during its active lifetime.  At its activation in 1962, it became the second such light tower on the east coast.

These towers deteriorated relatively quickly, and in 1983 the Coast Guard first suggested decommissioning it. It was retained, however, due to the proximity of the America's Cup races. In 1989 the Coast Guard announced that the light was to be removed, and in 1992 it was dismantled. The following year the pieces were sunk off Long Island as part of an artificial reef. A lighted buoy replaced the tower at a position somewhat further south, where it remains at present.

Keepers

Lightship LV-14 (1853–1856)

Lightship LV-11 (1856–1897)

Lightship LV-39 (1897–1935)

Lightship LV-102/WAL 525 (1945–1962)

Lighthouse (1962–1989)

References

Lighthouses completed in 1962
Lighthouses in Washington County, Rhode Island
1962 establishments in Rhode Island
Buildings and structures demolished in 1992
1992 disestablishments in the United States